Laemmlein Buttenwieser (January 16, 1825 – September 23, 1901) was a German-born Talmudist, linguist, and educator.

Biography
Buttenwieser was born in Wassertrüdingen, Bavaria on January 16, 1825. He was descended from a long line of rabbis: his father was rabbi of Wassertrüdingen, and his grandfather and great-grandfather were rabbis at Buttenwiesen. He received his education at the gymnasium in Aschaffenburg and at the Universities of Würzburg and Prague, where he also studied for the rabbinate.

In July 1854, Buttenwieser emigrated to the United States, where he initially worked as a rabbi. However, he did not enjoy this work and instead became a teacher of languages. He taught at the Talmud Yelodim School in Cincinnati and from 1961 worked as an instructor at the Hebrew Education Society of Philadelphia and at the short-lived Maimonides College in that city. In 1873, he moved to New York, where he worked as a private tutor in Hebrew and Talmudic studies. That same year, he was appointed as a teacher of languages in the New York City public schools, a position he held until his retirement in 1886.

He died at his home in New York City on Yom Kippur, September 23, 1901, after a two weeks' illness. He was survived by his wife, two daughters, and one son, Joseph L. Buttenwieser, a successful real estate dealer and broker.

References
 

1825 births
1901 deaths
19th-century American Jews
American people of German-Jewish descent
Bavarian emigrants to the United States
Jewish American academics
Linguists from the United States
Charles University alumni
University of Würzburg alumni